Catarina Álvares Paraguaçu, also known as Catarina do Brasil (baptized June 1528 – 1586), was a Brazilian Tupinambá Indian. She was born in what is today the state of Bahia (dates unknown) and was married to Portuguese sailor Diogo Álvares Correia, also known as "Caramuru". She and Caramuru became the first Brazilian Christian family.

Her father, the cacique of the Tupinambás, offered her as a wife to Correia, since he was a prominent figure to the Indians. Correia travelled to France in 1526, taking his wife with him, and in 1528, in Saint-Malo, Catarina was baptized, receiving the name Catarina do Brasil.

Death and legacy

Paraguaçu died in 1586, and, as per her last will and testament, her possessions were all donated to the Benedictine monks. She is buried at the Church of Our Lady of Grace (Igreja da Graça), in Salvador, Bahia.

Dreams
A legend says that Catarina dreamed constantly about castaways dying of cold and hunger. In one of those dreams, she saw a woman carrying a baby in her arms. Trusting in the mystic qualities of her dreams, Caramuru told the people to search everywhere around the shores. Many castaways were found, but no woman among them.

Days later, Catarina dreamed again with the same woman, who told her to build a house for her in her village. Soon after, a statue of the Virgin Mary carrying Child Jesus was found.

The statue can now be found at the altar of the Igreja da Graça.

In popular culture
 Paraguaçu appears in Santa Rita Durão's 1781 epic poem Caramuru, based on Diogo Correia's life. She is depicted as a seer, able to foresee the Dutch invasions of Brazil.
 Paraguaçu was portrayed by Camila Pitanga in the 2001 film Caramuru: A Invenção do Brasil, a loose, comedic adaptation of Durão's poem.

References

Date of birth unknown
Year of birth unknown
1586 deaths
16th-century Brazilian people
People from Bahia
Brazilian Roman Catholics
Brazilian people of indigenous peoples descent
Indigenous people of Eastern Brazil
16th-century indigenous people of the Americas
Tupí people
Visions of Jesus and Mary
Indigenous women